This is a detailed discography for American outlaw country music singer Billy Joe Shaver.  His first six albums were credited to him under his full name, but starting with 1993's Tramp On Your Street albums were credited to the band Shaver (composed of Billy Joe and his son Eddy Shaver on guitar).  Following Eddy's death in 2000 and the release of The Earth Rolls On in 2001, albums were once again credited only to Billy Joe Shaver.  In all, this discography comprises 17 studio albums, 8 live albums and 9 compilation albums, with 20 singles released.  Billy Joe has appeared on a variety of record labels over the years.

Studio Albums

1970s, 1980s and 1990s

2000s and 2010s

Live Albums

Compilation Albums

Singles

Music videos

References 

Discographies of American artists
Country music discographies